Lino Waldemar Maldonado Gárnica (born 8 February 1989) is a Chilean footballer.

He played for Cobresal.

Honours

Player
Cobresal
 Primera División de Chile (1): 2015 Apertura

External links
 
 

1989 births
Living people
Chilean footballers
Cobresal footballers
San Antonio Unido footballers
Deportes Iberia footballers
Deportes Temuco footballers
Chilean Primera División players
Segunda División Profesional de Chile players
Association football forwards